The 2005 Arab League summit, officially 17th Ordinary Session of the Council of the League of Arab States at the Summit Level, was a regular summit that was held in Algiers, Algeria in March 2005. The city hosted the summit for the third time, following 1973 and 1988. Prior to the conference, the foreign ministers met to agree on proposals that will be presented to the leaders for approval. The Palestinian issue, the unrest in Lebanon and Iraq, Egypt's bid for a permanent seat on the Security Council, and political reform in the member nations were all topics of discussion at the summit.

Participating leaders 
Yemen, Bahrain, Oman, Jordan, and Lebanon's leaders did not attend due to work commitments.

  – Secretary-General Amr Moussa
  – President Abdelaziz Bouteflika (host)
  – Crown Prince Salman bin Hamad Al Khalifa
  – President Hosni Mubarak
  – President Ghazi Mashal Ajil al-Yawer
  – Prime Minister Faisal Al-Fayez
  – Crown Prince Sabah Al-Ahmad Al-Jaber Al-Sabah
  – Foreign Minister Mahmoud Hammoud
  – Leader Muammar Gaddafi
  – President Maaouya Ould Sid'Ahmed Taya
  – King Mohammed VI
  – Deputy Prime Minister Fahd bin Mahmoud al Said
  – President Mahmoud Abbas
  – Emir Hamad bin Khalifa Al Thani
  – Crown Prince Abdullah bin Abdulaziz Al Saud
  – President Omar al-Bashir
  – President Bashar al-Assad
  – President Zine El Abidine Ben Ali
  – Ruler of Fujairah Hamad bin Mohammed Al Sharqi
  – Vice president Abdrabbuh Mansur Hadi

References

2005 conferences
2005 in international relations
2005 in Algeria
March 2005 events in Africa
2005
History of Algiers